Dungeon World is a tabletop fantasy roleplaying game created by Sage LaTorra and Adam Koebel. The game uses the Powered by the Apocalypse engine originally designed for Apocalypse World and used in Monsterhearts and other games. The game is advertised as having old school style with modern rules. The text of the game was released under the Creative Commons Attribution 3.0 Unported License.

Dungeon World raised just over $80,000 from 2400 backers on Kickstarter before it was released.

Setting 
The setting for Dungeon World is created by the game master following the instruction of "Draw maps and leave blank spaces" allowing details to emerge in play.

Gameplay 

Dungeon World uses the Powered by the Apocalypse engine. The game uses six ability scores (Strength, Dexterity, Constitution, Intelligence, Wisdom, Charisma) and  a character class  model with choices of Bard, Cleric, Fighter, Immolator, Paladin, Ranger, Thief, or Wizard.

Like other Powered by the Apocalypse games, actions in Dungeon World are called moves. When a player character makes a move, the player rolls two six-sided dice and adds the appropriate ability modifier. On a result of 10+ the move succeeds without complication. On a result of 7-9 the move partially succeeds or succeeds with a problem, allowing the GM to make a move of their own. On a result of 6 or less there is trouble (which may or may not mean failure). The character gains an experience point and the GM makes a move. Characters share general moves and gain unique moves from their class.

To represent character relationships and facilitate quick setup, each class lists bonds that show, before the game starts, how the characters see each other, filling one name of one other player character in the blank space of each bond. Example bonds are:
 ___ owes me their life, whether they admit it or not.
 I have sworn to protect ___.
 I worry about the ability of ___ to survive in the dungeon.
 ___ is soft, but I will make them hard like me.

The full rules for Dungeon World were released in a Dungeon World SRD.

History
Dungeon World was developed starting in 2010 and an introductory edition was brought to Gen Con Indy 2011. Fundraising for the game itself begun via Kickstarter in mid 2012. More than a year after being launched it was still the eighth fastest current seller at DriveThruRPG.

Reception
Dungeon World was the 2012 Golden Geek RPG of the Year, the 2012 Indie RPG Game of the Year (as well as winning the awards for Best Support and Best Production) and was the Best Rules Gold Winner in the 2013 Ennie Awards.

References

External links 
 Dungeon World - Official website
  Sagelt / Dungeon-World - Official source text from the book on GitHub
 Dungeon World - Text from the book, formatted for the web.
 Dungeon World GM's Screen - Nate Marcel official artist for Dungeon World

Creative Commons-licensed games
ENnies winners
Fantasy role-playing games
Indie role-playing games
Kickstarter-funded tabletop games
Role-playing games introduced in 2012